Chvalkovice is a municipality and village in Náchod District in the Hradec Králové Region of the Czech Republic. It has about 800 inhabitants.

Administrative parts
Villages of Kopaniny, Malá Bukovina, Miskolezy, Střeziměřice, Velká Bukovina and Výhled are administrative parts of Chvalkovice.

References

Villages in Náchod District